The Matrix Revolutions is a 2003 American science fiction action film written and directed by the Wachowskis. It is the third  installment in The Matrix film series, released six months following The Matrix Reloaded. The film stars Keanu Reeves, Laurence Fishburne, Carrie-Anne Moss, Hugo Weaving, Jada Pinkett Smith, Monica Bellucci, Lambert Wilson, and Mary Alice who replaces Gloria Foster as the Oracle following her death in 2001.

The film was released simultaneously in 108 territories on November 5, 2003, by Warner Bros. Pictures. While being the final entry in the original trilogy of the series, the Matrix storyline was continued in The Matrix Online video game. It was the first live-action feature film to be released in both regular and IMAX theaters at the same time. It received mixed reviews from critics, with praise for its visual style, performances, action sequences, direction, cinematography, and music, but criticism for its plot, citing it as the weakest film in the series. 

Despite the reception, the film was a financial success and grossed $427.3 million worldwide. A fourth film, titled The Matrix Resurrections, began production in February 2020, and was released on December 22, 2021.

Plot

Picking up immediately where Reloaded ended, Neo and Bane still lie unconscious in the medical bay of the ship Hammer. Inside the Matrix, Neo is trapped in a subway station named Mobil Ave, a transition zone between the Matrix and the machine world. He meets a "family" of programs, including a girl named Sati. The "father" tells Neo the subway is controlled by the Trainman, a program loyal to the Merovingian. When Neo tries to board a train with the family, the Trainman refuses and overpowers him.

Seraph contacts Morpheus and Trinity on behalf of the Oracle, who informs them of Neo's confinement. Seraph, Morpheus and Trinity enter Club Hel, where they confront the Merovingian and force him to release Neo. Troubled by visions of the Machine City, Neo visits the Oracle, who reveals that Smith intends to destroy both the Matrix and the real world. She tells him that "everything that has a beginning has an end." After Neo leaves, a large group of Smiths assimilates Sati and Seraph. The Oracle does not resist assimilation, and Smith gains her powers of precognition.

In the real world, the crews of the Nebuchadnezzar and the Hammer find and reactivate Niobe's ship, the Logos. They interrogate Bane, who says that he has no recollection of the earlier massacre. As the captains plan their defense of Zion, Neo requests a ship to travel to the Machine City. Motivated by her encounter with the Oracle, Niobe offers him the Logos. Neo departs, accompanied by Trinity. Bane, who has stowed away on the Logos, takes Trinity hostage. Neo realizes that Bane has been assimilated by Smith, and a fight ensues. Bane burns Neo's eyes with a power cable, blinding him. Neo discovers that he can still "see" machine source code in the real world and uses this ability to kill Bane. Trinity pilots them to the Machine City.

Niobe and Morpheus rush toward Zion in the Hammer to aid the human defenses. Zion's shipyard is overwhelmed by a horde of Sentinels, and the fatally wounded Captain Mifune instructs Kid to open the gate for the Hammer, which he does with the aid of Zee. When it arrives, it discharges its EMP, disabling all the Sentinels present but also Zion's remaining defenses. The humans are forced to retreat and wait for the next attack, thinking it will be their last stand.

The Logos is attacked by a wave of machines outside of the Machine City. To avoid the onslaught, they fly above them to open sky, and then crash into a building, fatally wounding Trinity. Neo enters the Machine City and encounters the leadership of the machines in the form of the "Deus Ex Machina." Neo warns that Smith plans to conquer both the Matrix and the real world and offers to stop Smith in exchange for peace with Zion. The Deus Ex Machina agrees, and the Sentinels shut down, stopping the attack on Zion.

The Machines plug Neo into the Matrix, whose population has now been entirely assimilated by Smith. The Smith with the Oracle's powers steps forth, telling Neo that he has foreseen his victory against Neo. After a protracted fight, Neo appears to concede defeat and allows himself to be assimilated. Outside the Matrix, the machines send a surge of energy into Neo's body, which inside the Matrix causes the Neo-Smith clone, then all the other Smith clones, to be destroyed, leaving the Oracle lying there and causing Neo's life to be sacrificed. The Sentinels withdraw from Zion, Morpheus and Niobe embrace, and Neo's body is carried away by the machines.

The Matrix is rebooted, and the Architect meets the Oracle in a park. They agree that the peace will last "as long as it can" and that those humans who desire it will be offered the opportunity to leave the Matrix. The Oracle tells Sati (who created a beautiful sunrise for Neo) that she thinks they will see Neo again. Seraph asks the Oracle if she knew this would happen. She replies that she did not know, but she believed.

Cast

Production
Shortly after the release of The Matrix Reloaded, The film's budget was estimated between US$110 million and $150 million.

Filming occurred concurrently with its predecessor, The Matrix Reloaded, and live-action sequences for the video game Enter the Matrix. This took place primarily at Fox Studios in Sydney, Australia. Most notably, the subway scenes were filmed at the disused tunnels of St James railway station, and the end sequence with the Oracle and the Architect was filmed in the Royal Botanic Garden.  Carrie-Anne Moss injured her ankle during the shooting in Australia.

Soundtrack

In contrast to its predecessors, very few "source" tracks are used in the film. Aside from Don Davis' score, again collaborating with Juno Reactor, only one external track (by Pale 3) is used. Although Davis rarely focuses on strong melodies, familiar leitmotifs from earlier in the series reappear. For example, Neo and Trinity's love theme—which briefly surfaces in the two preceding films—is finally fully expanded into "Trinity Definitely"; the theme from the Zion docks in Reloaded returns as "Men in Metal", and the energetic drumming from the Reloaded tea house fight between Neo and Seraph opens "Tetsujin", as Seraph, Trinity and Morpheus fight off Club Hel's three doormen. The climactic battle theme, named "Neodämmerung" (in reference to Wagner's Götterdämmerung), features a choir singing extracts (shlokas) from the Pavamana Mantra, introduced in the Upanishads. The chorus can be roughly translated from Sanskrit as follows: "lead us from untruth to truth, lead us from darkness to light, lead us from death to immortality, peace peace peace". The extracts were brought to Davis by the Wachowskis when he informed them that it would be wasteful for such a large choir to be singing simple "ooh"s and "aah"s (according to the DVD commentary, Davis felt that the dramatic impact of the piece would be lost if the choir was to sing 'This is the one, see what he can do' in plain English). These extracts return in the film's denouement, and in Navras, the track that plays over the closing credits (which may be considered a loose remix of "Neodämmerung").

Release
The Matrix Revolutions was released in theaters roughly three weeks after The Matrix Reloaded arrived on DVD, October 14, 2003.

The film had the widest release ever opening simultaneously in 108 territories at 1400 Greenwich Mean Time on November 5, 2003.

Reception

Box office
On opening day, The Matrix Revolutions scored $24.3 million, becoming the third-highest Wednesday opening, behind The Lord of the Rings: The Two Towers and Star Wars: Episode I – The Phantom Menace. During its three-day opening weekend, it would earn $48.5 million. In its first five days of release, the film grossed $83.8 million in the United States and Canada from 3,502 theaters, but dropped 66% during the second week. It had the highest five-day Wednesday opening for any Warner Bros. film until it was taken by Superman Returns in 2006. The film would even compete against the newly released family films Brother Bear and Elf.

Internationally, the film grossed $119 million in its first 5 days from 10,013 prints in 107 territories, with the third-biggest opening ever in Japan and Spain and the fourth biggest in the United Kingdom, Italy and Mexico. Combined, it grossed $203 million in its first five days. This made it the highest worldwide opening weekend for any film, holding the record until it was beaten by The Lord of the Rings: The Return of the King a month later. The Matrix Revolutions would also achieve the record for having the biggest international opening weekend for an R-rated film until 2015 when it was surpassed by Fifty Shades of Grey. The film grossed over $139 million in North America and approximately $427 million worldwide, roughly half of The Matrix Reloaded box-office total.

Home media
The Matrix Revolutions was released on DVD and VHS on April 6, 2004. The film grossed $116 million in DVD sales. Additionally, it was released on 4K Ultra HD Blu-ray on October 30, 2018.

Critical response

On review aggregation website Rotten Tomatoes, The Matrix Revolutions holds an approval rating of 34% based on 218 reviews, with an average rating of 5.30/10. The site's critical consensus reads, "A disappointing conclusion to the Matrix trilogy as characters and ideas take a back seat to the special effects." On Metacritic, the film has a weighted average score of 47 out of 100 based on 41 reviews, indicating "mixed or average reviews". Audiences polled by CinemaScore gave the film an average grade of "B" on an A+ to F scale, a grade down from the "B+" earned by the previous film and two grades down from the "A−" earned by the first film, therefore the second lowest grade earned by a film in the series.

Some critics criticized the film for being anticlimactic. Additionally, some critics regard the film as less philosophically ambiguous than its predecessor, The Matrix Reloaded. Critics had difficulty finding closure pertaining to events from The Matrix Reloaded, and were generally dissatisfied.

Roger Ebert of the Chicago Sun-Times gave the film three stars out of four, despite offering criticisms of his own, on the grounds that it at least provided closure to the story well enough so that fans following the series would prefer seeing it as to not.

Sequel

While making the Matrix films, the Wachowskis told their close collaborators that at that time they had no intention of making another installment after The Matrix Revolutions. Instead, they gave their blessing to the notion of gamers "inherit[ing] the storyline", and The Matrix Online video game was billed as the official continuation. In February 2015, in interviews promoting Jupiter Ascending, Lilly Wachowski called a return to The Matrix a "particularly repelling idea in these times", noting the studios' tendency to green-light sequels, reboots, and adaptations over original material, while Lana Wachowski, addressing rumors about a potential reboot, said that they had not heard anything, but she believed that the studio might be looking to replace them. At various times, Keanu Reeves and Hugo Weaving have stated that they would be willing to reprise their roles in potential Matrix films, but only if the Wachowskis were involved.

In March 2017, The Hollywood Reporter wrote that Warner Bros. was in early stages of developing a relaunch of the franchise, with Zak Penn in talks to write a treatment, and interest in getting Michael B. Jordan attached to star. According to the article neither the Wachowskis nor Joel Silver were involved at that stage, although the studio would like to get at minimum the blessing of the Wachowskis.

Warner Bros. officially announced the development on a fourth film in August 2019, with Lana Wachowski serving as director and producer on it. Lana wrote the screenplay with David Mitchell and Aleksander Hemon. Grant Hill produced it alongside Lana. The production is a joint-venture between Warner Bros. Pictures and Village Roadshow Pictures, similar to the original films. Keanu Reeves and Carrie-Anne Moss reprise their roles from the previous films; Laurence Fishburne and Hugo Weaving do not appear in the film. Production began in February 2020 in San Francisco, briefly halted due to the COVID-19 pandemic, and wrapped in November of that same year. The film, The Matrix Resurrections, had its world premiere in Toronto, Canada, on December 16, 2021, and was released to theaters and streaming services on December 22, 2021.

Notes

See also
 List of films featuring powered exoskeletons

References

External links

 
 
 
 
 The Matrix Revolutions Explained – a comparative-literature-style exegesis of selected parts of Matrix Revolutions.
 
 Understanding The Matrix Revolutions – A comparative guide to possible meaning and interpretations of The Matrix Revolutions
 The Matrix Revolution October 27, 2000 draft script by Andy & Larry Wachowski

2003 films
2000s English-language films
The Matrix (franchise) films
American martial arts films
2003 martial arts films
2003 science fiction action films
American science fiction action films
American sequel films
Cyberpunk films
Drone films
Films about blind people
Films about rebellions
Films about telepresence
Films shot in California
Films shot in Sydney
Gun fu films
Kung fu films
Martial arts science fiction films
Warner Bros. films
Silver Pictures films
Village Roadshow Pictures films
Films scored by Don Davis (composer)
Films directed by The Wachowskis
Films produced by Joel Silver
Films with screenplays by The Wachowskis
Films about computer hacking
2000s American films